Kup may refer to:

 Kup (Transformers), various characters in the Transformers franchise
 Kup, Hungary
 Kup, Poland
 Küp, in Turkey
 Kup (military rank), a military rank in North Korea
 Kup (cuneiform), a sign in cuneiform writing
 Kup, alternative transliteration of geup, a Korean term for a martial art rank
 Sports cup in Croatian names of various Croatian Cups
 Irv Kupcinet's nickname
 Potassium Uptake Permease (KUP) family, family of integral membrane transport proteins

See also
Kupp, surname